Josce of London was an English Jew and the Presbyter Judaeorum, or Chief Rabbi, of the Jews of England from 1217 to 1237.

Josce succeeded Jacob of London as Chief Rabbi on his death in 1217. This would imply that Josce was very wealthy, as only the wealthiest of the Jews obtained this position. In 1237 Josce was succeeded by Aaron of York, the Jewish financier and probable son of Josce of York.

He may have been that Josce of London who was the founder of the earliest college of the University of Paris in 1180.

References

12th-century births
13th-century deaths
13th-century English rabbis
Rabbis from London
English Orthodox Jews